XBB may refer to:

 SARS-CoV-2 Omicron variant § XBB, a subvariant of the virus that causes COVID-19
 The aboriginal Lower Burdekin languages of Australia
 The European Monetary Unit used in bond markets
 Blubber Bay Seaplane Base, British Columbia, Canada – see List of airports by IATA airport code: X